A cockapoo (portmanteau of cocker spaniel and poodle) is a dog crossbreed bred from a Cocker Spaniel and a Poodle, most commonly the Miniature Poodle. The Cockapoo was first bred by designer dog breeders in the United States with the aim of producing a healthy companion dog that, it is claimed by its supporters, does not inherit many of the health defects common in the two parent breeds due to hybrid vigor. Cocker Spaniels and Poodles have been deliberately crossed in the United States since the 1960s.

As with most animal crossbreeds, there is a great deal of variability in the Cockapoo's dimensions and appearance. All colors or combinations of colors can be found and the coat can be straight, wavy, or curled. Cockapoos can vary in temperament and in need for exercise.

In order to promote crossbreeding in the United States a dedicated club has been formed, the Cockapoo Club of America. Between 2019 and 2020, the average price in the UK rose by 168 percent, a result of increased demand caused by a national lockdown in response to the COVID-19 pandemic.

Cockapoos are available in F1, F2, and F2B, which is dependent on the parent dogs. An F1 Cockapoo is bred from a purebred poodle and a cocker spaniel. When 2 F1 Cockapoos are bred together this creates an F2 Cockapoo, and there are many other combinations including breeding them back towards the original poodle or cocker spaniel breed.

See also
 List of dog crossbreeds
 Poodle crossbreed

References

External links

 
 Cockapoo Generations Explained - https://doodledogs.club/cockapoo-dog-breed-information-and-personality-traits-f1-f2-f1b-chart/

Dog crossbreeds